Cane-line is a Danish furniture company based in Rynkeby (Odense), Denmark. It is a producer and manufacturer of indoor and outdoor furniture and accessories

History 

Cane-line A/S was founded in 1987. The company sold indoor furniture to furniture chains in Scandinavia, expanding its range to include outdoor furniture in 1997.

Brian Djernes became the CEO of Cane-line in 1997. The company was based in Odense until 2003, but have since moved the head office to Skovhuse, Rynkeby.

Cane-line is an international design company with 90 employees. Cane-line Australia was founded in 2011 and Cane-line USA in 2017.

Production 
Cane-line designs furniture in the Nordic style of Scandinavia. It has production sites in Indonesia and Lithuania. The company also has a sales subsidiary with a warehouses in Melbourne, Australia, and in New York, USA.

Collaborations 

The Cane-line designers and the external designers all share roots in the Danish design tradition.

Some of Cane-line's design collaborations include:

 Foersom & Hiort-Lorenzen MDD
 Strand+Hvass
 Welling/Ludvik
 byKATO
 Søren Rose Studios
 Maria Berntsen

Design awards 

 Outdoor Sense 3-seater sofa, designed in 2022 by Foersom & Hiort-Lorenzen MDD, Bolig Magasinets design favorites 2022 - winner
 Basket collection, designed in 2021 by Søren Rose Studio, Bolig Magasinets design favorites 2021 - winner, German Design award 2022 – special mention
 Loop (Black Nest), displayed on Snedkernes Efterårsudstilling 2016
 Amaze 2-seater sofa, designed in 2014 by Foersom & Hiort-Lorenzen MDD, Interior Innovation Award 2015 – winner, German Design Award 2016 – special mention
 Conic modular sofa system, designed in 2012 by Foersom & Hiort-Lorenzen MDD, Interior Innovation Award 2013 – winner
 Nest coffee table/footstool, displayed on Snedkernes Efterårsudstilling 2009

Company awards 

 EY Entrepreneur of the Year 2021 – Winner of Denmark
 Succesvirksomhed 2021
 EY Entrepreneur of the Year, Fyn region 2019+ 2021
 PWC, Årets Ejerleder Fyn/Owner CEO of the Year, Region Winner, 2015 + 2019
 Tietgenprisen 2018

See also 
 Danish design
 List of Danish furniture designers

References 

Furniture companies of Denmark
Danish companies established in 1987
Organizations based in Odense